Stockholm Skavsta Airport (Swedish: Stockholm Skavsta flygplats), or Nyköping Airport  is an international airport near Nyköping, Sweden,  northwest of its urban area and approximately  southwest of Stockholm. It is served by low-cost airlines and cargo operators, and is the fifth-largest airport in Sweden, with an ability to handle 2.5 million passengers annually.

The airport is located far outside Stockholm Municipality and Stockholm County, but uses 'Stockholm' for marketing purposes. Locally the airport is referred to simply as 'Skavsta'. Stockholm's main international airport is Stockholm Arlanda Airport.

History 
An airbase during World War II, the airport was used as a military airport until 1980, when it was taken out of service.

The council of Nyköping Municipality, where the airport is located, decided in 1984 to take over its control and resume its activities. Civilian passenger air traffic started in September 1984, mainly to Arlanda which at the time had almost all air traffic in Stockholm. In 1998 (after deregulation allowing airlines and airports to compete with each other to a higher degree) the Nyköping municipal council put 90% of the capital of the airport up for sale, with the objective of strengthening its commercial management and enabling investments for its expansion. They acquired this parcel of shares and began the transformation of Skavsta, which has become the second airport of Stockholm and the favoured option for inhabitants who live in the area south of the Swedish capital.

The airport has a capacity of 2.5 million passengers per annum and is designed for expansion in the future. It is owned by ADC & HAS, the same company that owns Belfast International Airport, Orlando Sanford International Airport, Daniel Oduber Quirós International Airport (Liberia, Costa Rica), Mariscal Sucre International Airport (Quito, Ecuador), and Juan Santamaría International Airport (San José, Costa Rica).

In May 2021, Ryanair announced it would relocate all routes from Skavsta to Stockholm Arlanda Airport by October 2021. After initially claiming the option to leave some operations from Skavsta, Ryanair left the airport entirely on 30 October 2021.

Airlines and destinations 
The following airline offers scheduled services to and from Stockholm Skavsta Airport:

Statistics

Ground transportation

Car
Both short and long-term parking facilities are available. The terminal can be reached by foot from all parking areas.

Coach and bus
Flygbussarna airport coaches depart hourly, travelling directly between Stockholm Skavsta Airport and the City Terminal in Stockholm (approx. 90 min travel time). There are also airport buses to Södertälje, Linköping, Norrköping, and local stops in the southern parts of Stockholm. Local bus services are available to Nyköping's city centre and its railway station.

Train
It is served by regional trains (operated by SJ) on the Linköping–Stockholm–(Gävle) route. Local bus or taxi can be used to the airport.

Accidents and incidents
On 9 October 1974, a Tp 79 s/n 79005 of the Swedish Air Force crashed on approach to Nyköping Airport. All 27 people on board survived.

See also
List of the largest airports in the Nordic countries
Stockholm Arlanda Airport
Stockholm Bromma Airport
Stockholm Västerås Airport
Barkarby Airport
Södermanland County

References

External links 

Airports in Sweden
Buildings and structures in Södermanland County
International airports in Sweden